Birnen, Bohnen und Speck ("pears, beans and bacon") is a North German dish which is especially popular in the states of Schleswig-Holstein, Lower Saxony, Mecklenburg-Vorpommern and Hamburg. It also goes under the names of Bohnen, Birnen und Speck and, locally, the Low German names of Grööner Hein and Grönen Heini (lit: "Green Harry"). The seasonal availability of its ingredients means that the dish is mainly eaten in the months of August and September.

The dish is a type of stew, in which—as the name indicates—the main ingredients are pears, beans and speck (a kind of bacon). In North German country kitchens, potatoes would also be added, even though they are not specifically mentioned.

Ingredients 
Generally cut French beans (Brechbohnen) are used. In Hamburg on the markets occasionally "Turkish peas" may be found, despite its name a Vierlande bean variety that used to be frequently used for this dish.  During preparation several sprigs of savory are added to the beans.

The pears used for this dish are cooking pears, which are inedible raw. They are small, green, and rock-hard, lacking the sweetness of the popular eating varieties. In the Hamburg area, other varieties are used: the Vierländer and the rather sweeter Finkenwerder cooking pears. Bürgermeisterbirne pears may be used. They are not as sweet when raw.

Streaky and smoky bacon is traditionally used. 

The Hamburg and Schleswig-Holstein preference is to add potatoes to their Bohnen, Birnen und Speck that are still firm when cooked, such as the Cilena or Linda varieties. In Land Hadeln beef or lamb can also be cooked along with the bacon.

Preparation 
According to taste, the bacon is placed either in complete strips or cut up into water which is then brought to the boil. Meanwhile, the beans are cleaned, washed and cut into sections. After 25 minutes of cooking, the beans are added together with the savory to the bacon and cooking continues.
The flowers are removed from the pears, but the stalks are left on. The pears are left with their skins on throughout. They are then laid on the beans and everything is cooked together.

The peeled potatoes are boiled separately in salted water or cooked together with the rest of the stew. Towards the end of the overall cooking time of about 50 minutes, some flour is mixed with water, poured into the pot and briefly boiled up.

Typical quantities for four people are:
750 g	beans
500 g	pears
400 g	bacon
500 g	potatoes
1 sprig of savory
2 tbsp of flour

Each person is served one or two pears, a good portion of bacon, beans and potatoes and broth according to preference. A fresh beer goes well with the dish.

There are variations that do away with the savory, but add freshly chopped parsley towards the end, which use broth instead of water for cooking (ready-made or home-made) or which use pepper.

See also
 
 List of stews

References

External links 
Birnen, Bohnen und Speck or My German Genes 
Pears, String Beans and Bacon

North German cuisine
German stews
Pear dishes
Legume dishes
Bacon dishes

ksh:Fitschbunne